Matthew Panting (1682–1738) was a clergyman and Master of Pembroke College, Oxford.

Education
The son of Matthew Panting of Oxford, the young Matthew entered John Roysse's Free School in Abingdon (now Abingdon School)  and was scholar of Pembroke College. BA 1702, MA 1705, BD and Doctor of Divinity 1715.

Life
He was Master of Pembroke from 3 September 1714 until his death in 1738. rector of St Ebbe's church, Oxford (1714–19), rector of Coln St Rogers and canon of Gloucester cathedral (1718–38). He was author of Religious Vows, a Sermon (1732).

See also
 List of Old Abingdonians
 List of Pembroke College, Oxford, people

References

1682 births
1738 deaths
18th-century English Anglican priests
Masters of Pembroke College, Oxford
People educated at Abingdon School